Anthony Anderson (born 1970) is an American comedian and actor.

Anthony or Tony Anderson/sen may also refer to:

 Anthony Anderson (American football) (born 1956), retired professional American football running back
 Anthony Anderson (baritone) (born   1998), American opera singer
 Anthony Anderson (basketball) (born 1981), American professional basketball player
 Anthony Anderson (murderer), British murderer committing his crimes in mid-1980s
 Anthony Anderson (politician) (1767–1847), Scottish-born merchant and political figure in Lower Canada
 Anthony Anderson (producer), Australian film producer
 Anthony Anderson (theologian) (died 1593), English theological writer and preacher
 C. Anthony Anderson (born 1940), American philosopher
 Tony Anderson (1942–2020), Australian rules footballer
 Ian Button (born 1962), English guitarist who produced some work under the pseudonym Anthony Anderson
 Anthony Andersen, Inuit politician

See also
 Antonio Anderson (born 1985), American basketball player
 Antonio Anderson (American football) (born 1973), American football defensive lineman